Cracu River may refer to:

Cracu, a tributary of the Șușița in Gorj County, Romania
Cracu Tisei River
Cracul Comarnic River
Pârâul Cracul Lung